The 1973 Tyne and Wear County Council election was held on 12 April 1973 as part of the first elections to the new local authorities established by the Local Government Act 1972 in England and Wales. 104 councillors were elected from 95 electoral divisions across the region's five boroughs. Each division returned either one or two county councillors each by First-past-the-post voting for a four-year term of office. The election took place ahead of the elections to the area's metropolitan borough councils, which followed on 10 May 1973.

Election results 
The election resulted in a clear majority for the Labour Party, which won 74 of the 104 seats on the new Council.

The election resulted in the following composition of the County Council:

Results by district and electoral division

Gateshead 
The Metropolitan Borough of Gateshead area was represented on the new Tyne and Wear County Council by 20 councillors from 15 electoral divisions. Five of the electoral divisions returned two councillors (Chester-le-Street, and Gateshead Nos. 1, 2, 3 and 4), the remainder returned one councillor. Labour took the majority of the seats in the Gateshead area: returning 17 councillors, compared to two for the Conservatives and one Residents Association councillor.

Blaydon (Central)

Blaydon (East)

Blaydon (West)

Chester-le-Street

Felling No. 1

Felling No. 2

Felling No. 3

Gateshead No. 1

Gateshead No. 2

Gateshead No. 3

Gateshead No. 4 (Wrekenton)

Ryton

Whickham No. 1 (Dunston)

Whickham No. 2

Whickham No. 3

Newcastle upon Tyne 
The Newcastle City Council area was represented on the County Council by 26 councillors from 26 electoral divisions. Labour won 16 seats, to the Conservatives' 9. One Independent councillor was elected, in the new Jesmond division.

Benwell

Blakelaw

Castle Ward No. 1

Castle Ward No. 2

Dene

East City

Elswick

Fawdon

Fenham

Gosforth No. 1

Gosforth No. 2

Heaton

Jesmond

Kenton

Moorside

Newburn No. 1

Newburn No. 2

Newburn No. 3

Sandyford

Scotswood

St Anthonys

St Lawrence

Walker

Walkergate

West City

Wingrove

North Tyneside 
The Metropolitan Borough of North Tyneside area was represented on the new County Council by 18 councillors from 17 electoral divisions. One of the electoral divisions returned two councillors (Tynemouth No. 2), the remainder returned one councillor. Labour took the majority of the seats in the area: returning 12 councillors, with the Conservatives winning four, and the Liberals and an Independent each winning one.

Longbenton No. 1

Longbenton No. 2

Longbenton No. 3

Longbenton No. 4

Seaton Valley (Backworth and Earsdon)

Tynemouth No. 1 

Tynemouth No. 2

Tynemouth No. 3

Tynemouth No. 4

Tynemouth No. 5

Wallsend No. 1

Wallsend No. 2

Wallsend No. 3

Wallsend No. 4

Whitley Bay No. 1

Whitley Bay No. 2

Whitley Bay No. 3

South Tyneside 
The Metropolitan Borough of South Tyneside area was represented on the new Tyne and Wear County Council by 15 councillors from 12 electoral divisions. Three of the electoral divisions returned two councillors (South Shields Nos. 2, 3 and 4), the remainder returned one councillor. Labour took the majority of the seats in the area: returning 11 councillors, with the Conservatives taking four.

Boldon

Hebburn No. 1

Hebburn No. 2 

Jarrow No. 1

Jarrow No. 2

South Shields No. 1

South Shields No. 2

South Shields No. 3

South Shields No. 4

South Shields No. 5

South Shields No. 6

Whitburn

Sunderland 
The Metropolitan Borough of Sunderland area was represented on the new Tyne and Wear County Council by 25 councillors from 25 electoral divisions. Labour took the majority of the seats in the Sunderland area, returning 18 councillors, ahead of seven for the Conservatives.

Bishopswearmouth

Castletown and Hylton

Central

Colliery

Deptford and Pallion 

Downhill

Ford and Pennywell

Fulwell

Hendon

Hetton No. 1

Hetton No. 2

Houghton-le-Spring No. 1

Houghton-le-Spring No. 2

Houghton-le-Spring No. 3

Humbledon

Monkwearmouth and Roker

Ryhope with Burdon

Silksworth

Southwick

St Chad's

St Michael's

Thorney Close

Thornhill

Washington No. 1

Washington No. 2

References

1973
1973 English local elections